Harry Flynn may refer to:

Harry Joseph Flynn (1933–2019), American Roman Catholic archbishop
Harry Flynn (character), a villain character in the video game Uncharted 2: Among Thieves
Harry Flynn (publishing), vice-president of Marvel Books

See also
Flynn (surname)

de:Harry J. Flynn